Woody Plays Woody (2012) is a compilation of live performances by trumpeter-composer Woody Shaw taken from the Woody Shaw Live Vol. 1-4 series originally released by HighNote Records between 2000 and 2005. Four of the six tracks are dedicated to influences and fellow musicians and it is the first and only CD to ever include Woody Shaw's original compositions exclusively. 

Woody Plays Woody was produced by Shaw's son and musical heir, Woody Shaw III, who details the background and history of the music in his extended liner notes.

Reception

Jeff Krow of Audiophile Audition said of the CD: "What stands out in listening to this CD approximately 35 years after these songs were recorded is the vibrancy of Shaw’s imagination, and his intensity in playing his horn."

Track listing 
All compositions by Woody Shaw
 "Little Red's Fantasy" - 10:44 Originally released on Live Volume Three
 "Rahsaan's Run" - 11:50 Originally released on Live Volume Two 
 "Stepping Stone" - 11:03 Originally released on Live Volume One 
 "Organ Grinder" - 10:04 Originally released on Live Volume Three 
 "OPEC" - 11:44 Originally released on Live Volume Four 
 "Ginseng People" - 11:40 Originally released on Live Volume Three

Personnel 
Woody Shaw - trumpet, flugelhorn
Carter Jefferson - tenor saxophone, soprano saxophone
Steve Turre - trombone, bass trombone 
Mulgrew Miller - piano
Larry Willis - piano
Stafford James - bass
Victor Lewis - drums

References 

2012 compilation albums
2012 live albums
Woody Shaw compilation albums
Woody Shaw live albums
HighNote Records live albums
HighNote Records compilation albums
Albums recorded at Keystone Korner